Kanna may refer to:

Plants
Mesembryanthemum tortuosum, syn. Sceletium tortuosum, a Southern African succulent with psychoactive properties
Platysace cirrosa, a Western Australian perennial herb
Caroxylon aphyllum, a shrub

Japan
Kanna (era), a Japanese name for the years 985–987
 Kanna or Japanese plane, a wood working tool

Art and entertainment

Film & TV
 Kanna (film), a 2007 Indian movie
 Kanna Kamui, a main character from the Japanese anime/manga Miss Kobayashi's Dragon Maid

People
Kanna (given name), a feminine Japanese given name
Yonadam Kanna (born 1951), president of the Assyrian Democratic Movement and member of the Iraqi Parliament

Places
Kanna (Lycaonia), ancient town now in Turkey
Kanna, Gunma, a town in Gunma Prefecture, Japan
Kanna, Poland, a village in southern Poland

See also
Kannas (disambiguation)
Kana (disambiguation)
Canna (disambiguation)